LTBF may refer to:
Let's Try Bass Fishing
Liver Tissue Blood Flow
Long Term Blood Flow
Balıkesir Airport, by the ICAO airport code